Anthony J. Antelo Devereux (1878–1940) was polo player and the winner of the National Hunt Cup.

References
He was born in 1878. He fell from his horse on December 13, 1920, and a blood clot led to a stroke and paralysis of his left arm and the left side of his face. He died in 1940.
His suit which was bespoked in October 1940 at Mlasovsky & Wagner of Philadelphia, before a couple of months his dead, was sold on internet auction site eBay. This suit would be knocked down to a Japanese collector in 2018.

References

1878 births
1940 deaths
American polo players